Thomas van Leeuwen (born 12 September 1994) is a Dutch motorcycle racer. He won the Dutch ONK Moto3 Championship in 2013. In 2014 and 2015 he raced in the FIM CEV Moto3 Championship.

Career statistics

Grand Prix motorcycle racing

By season

Races by year

References

External links

Living people
1994 births
Dutch motorcycle racers
125cc World Championship riders
Moto3 World Championship riders
21st-century Dutch people